Selena Forrest (born ), is an American fashion model. As of 2017, Models.com ranked her as one of the Top 50 models in the fashion industry.

Early life
Forrest was born in Lafayette, Louisiana, and relocated to California after Hurricane Katrina. She changed schools repeatedly as her family moved first to San Pedro, then Long Beach, and finally Riverside.

Career

Forrest was discovered in Huntington Beach in 2015. Forrest manually removed her own braces to launch her career and first job.

A few months later, Forrest signed with Next Models, debuting as a Proenza Schouler exclusive in 2016. She has appeared in campaigns for Yves Saint Laurent, Proenza Schouler, Calvin Klein,
 Prada, Dior, Valentino, Fenty Beauty, Topshop, DKNY, H&M and Adidas.

On the runway she has walked for Alexander McQueen, Céline, Chanel, Emilio Pucci (which she closed) Fendi, Kenzo, Oscar de la Renta, Roberto Cavalli, Tom Ford, Vera Wang, and Versace among many others.

She was the cover model for the i-D "Futurewise" issue as well as twice appearing on the cover The New York Times style magazine, T.

Forrest has spoken out on issues of racial equity in the fashion industry, critiquing designers who don't cast models of color as well as the lack of stylists able to care for black women's hair properly.

Personal life
Speaking to The Cut, Forrest described her sexuality as, "I love girls. Or, you know what, I just love people. So, that’s what it is. I don’t really categorize it, but if there was a  category, I would probably be bisexual. But I have never been with a guy."

References 

People from Lafayette, Louisiana
Female models from Louisiana
Female models from California
African-American female models
Bisexual women
Living people
People from Huntington Beach, California
LGBT models
LGBT people from Louisiana
1999 births
Next Management models
21st-century African-American people
21st-century African-American women